was a Japanese department store franchise run by Sogo & Seibu.

History

In 1984, Ito-Yokado, a company that co-operated with J. W. Robinson's backed by restructuring funds from the Sapporo branch of Matsuzakaya, started . Following the next year, the first Robinson Japan store was open in Kasukabe, where the Tōbu Isesaki Line exists as it was outside of Ito-Yokado's area of dominance. Originally a Seibu Department Stores branch was planned in Kasukabe, but as Seibu's contract agreement was terminated during the construction, Ito-Yokado capitalize the opportunity to build the first Robinson Japan. This is in coincidence that the western exit of the Kasukabe Station is near the Kasukabe branch of Ito-Yokado.

Stores
 Kasukabe, Saitama (opened on November 1985)

External links
  Official Website
  Odawara Dynacity (Odawara branch) Official Website

Department stores of Japan
Retail companies established in 1984
Retail companies disestablished in 2009
Sogo & Seibu